is a Japanese manga series written and illustrated by Riko Miyagi. The manga was serialized in Shueisha's Margaret magazine. The manga is licensed and published in Chinese in Taiwan by Tong Li Publishing. The manga has been adapted into a live-action Japanese television drama, which was broadcast on Fuji TV between January 13 and March 17, 2009.

Media

Manga
Mei-chan no Shitsuji is written and illustrated by Riko Miyagi. The manga is serialised in Shueisha's Margaret magazine. The individual chapters have been collected into 20 tankōbon by Shueisha. The series ended on January 25, 2013 and was followed by a sequel called Mei-chan no Shitsuji DX in 2014. The manga is licensed and published in Taiwan by Tong Li Publishing.

Drama
The manga has been adapted into a live-action Japanese television drama, which was broadcast on Fuji TV between January 13 and March 17, 2009. The Region 2 DVD Box set for the series was released on June 17, 2009.

Cast

Awards

Reception
The Mei-chan no Shitsuji series was ranked 6th best selling manga series in Japan in the first half of 2009 with an estimated 2,580,155 copies sold between November 17, 2008 to May 17, 2009. The first volume of Mei-chan no Shitsuji was ranked the 36th best selling manga in Japan in the first half of 2009 with 334,536 copies sold from November 17, 2008 to May 17, 2009. The Mei-chan no Shitsuji series was ranked 7th best-selling manga series in 2009 with 3,076,659 copies sold. The first volume was ranked 12th on the Tohan charts between January 13 and 19, 2009. It was ranked 12th again between January 27 and February 2, 2009, and was ranked 10th between February 10 and 16, 2009. The second volume was ranked 13th between January 13 and 19, 2009. The third volume was ranked 19th. The fourth volume was ranked 37th. The fifth volume was ranked 24th. The sixth volume was ranked 25th. The seventh volume was ranked 23rd and 30th. The ninth volume was ranked 1st, 5th and 16th. The tenth volume was ranked 2nd, 14th and 30th.

All 10 episodes of Mei-chan no Shitsuji drama have been listed on the Japanese Anime TV rankings. The DVD box for the drama series was ranked the second best selling DVD between June 8–14, 2009 with 11,170 copies sold. Mei-chan no Shitsuji was awarded two prizes at the 60th Japanese Drama Academy Awards on April 22, 2009. Mei-chan no Shitsuji was awarded best drama and Takeru Satoh was awarded best supporting actor.

References

External links
Official Fuji TV Mei-chan no Shitsuji website 

Romantic comedy anime and manga
2006 manga
Shōjo manga
Shueisha franchises
Japanese television dramas based on manga
2009 Japanese television series debuts
2009 Japanese television series endings